Famille chrétienne is a French Roman Catholic weekly magazine published in France since 1978.

History
The magazine was started in January 1978, as the sister publication of Famiglia Cristiana, an Italian Catholic magazine.

In 1981, the magazine was acquired by Rémy Montagne. In 1992, it was merged with Média-Participations.

In 2008, it had a circulation of 63,000.

Content
The magazine covers national and international news, individual faith, and Catholic news. Its editorial stance is conservative.

References

External links
 Official website

1978 establishments in France
Catholic magazines
Conservatism in France
Conservative magazines
Political magazines published in France
Weekly magazines published in France
Magazines established in 1978
Religious magazines
Catholicism in France